Aquí y allá (English: Here and There) is a 2012 drama film directed by Antonio Méndez Esparza.  The film is about a Mexican immigrant who returns home to a small mountain village in Guerrero, Mexico after years of working in the US, and struggles to rebuild his family and follow his dream of starting a band: the Copa Kings.  The film won the International Critics' Week Grand Prize at the 2012 Cannes Film Festival.

Plot 
Pedro returns home to the village of Copanatoyac, the "(Aquí) or Here" of the title, in the Sierra mountains of Guerrero, Mexico. After a few years working in New York to support his family back home, he now finds his daughters on the verge of adolescence, and is unsure of what to expect.  The younger of the two, Heidi, quickly becomes eager to reconnect, while his older daughter, Lorena, is more distant than he imagined.  His wife, Teresa, still has the same smile.  Although, she senses he may have had a woman in the US, and is guarded in their intimate moments.  Having saved his earnings from two long periods of work in the US, Pedro hopes to now finally make a better life at home with his family, without having to leave them again.  He even finally plans to pursue his own version of the American Dream on the side by starting a band: the Copa Kings.  Only the purity of music seems able to diffuse Lorena's moody resentment toward her father's years of absence.

The villagers think this year's crop will be bountiful. There is also good work in the growing city of Tlapa an hour away. But the locals are wise to a life of insecurity, and their thoughts are often of family members or opportunities far away, north of the border. While working in the cornfields, Pedro meets and begins to mentor a teenager, Leo, who dreams of the US.  Leo's love of breakdancing helps him to win over Karla, a studious girl he meets but a folk dancer herself.  Their budding first love recalls Pedro's and Teresa's of a generation before.

For Pedro, whether consoling the grieving mother of a friend who died inexplicably "over there", or meeting a new nephew being raised by extended family members because his parents have emigrated to the US—that place, the "(Allá) or There" of the title, somehow always feels very present, practically knocking at the door.

Teresa soon becomes pregnant with a third child, but complications force Pedro to deal with the ensuing medical issues and their expense.  He also begins to have moments of triumph playing local concerts and dances with the Copa Kings—as Pedro sings in his song "Quiero Brindar", "I wanna drink to all I've got and to all I've accomplished."

Although earning a living as a band leader and musician proves difficult.  For the locals, work in the fields depends on a good harvest, and construction work seems determined by inexplicable economic forces outside of their control.  Pedro may, once again, be forced to confront the paradox that, "in order to feed their love ones, emigrants have to leave them behind."

Critical reception 
Upon the film's premiere at the 2012 Cannes Film Festival, the American trade reviews were predominantly positive.  Johnathan Holland of Variety wrote that the film is a "quietly devastating exploration" of its subject and that "the script is beautifully observant of the stresses immigration places on family and self."  However, Neil Young of The Hollywood Reporter wrote that the film "surprisingly says little about the hot-button subjects it ambitiously sets out to explore.".  Ryan Lattanzio of Indiewire wrote that "In the vein of Ozu or even Apichatpong Weerasethakul, the film is composed of sublime fragments of life passing by" and concluded with the statement, "Peaceful, almost biblical and completely absorbing, this film is a masterpiece."

French critics were overwhelmingly positive on the film. Jacques Mandelbaum of Le Monde wrote that the film is "a remarkable first feature" by the director, and that "the deep love that binds this man and wife, the tricks the father uses to regain the look of his daughters, adolescents who are discreet and facetious in sweetly paying him the suffering of his remoteness, is all rendered with a delicacy and almost miraculous simplicity.". Comparing the film to other Mexican cinema, Bruno Icher of Liberation writes that the film is "a new proposal, delicate and charming in a register intimate and almost quasi-documentary."  Telerama pointed out the film's "humanistic approach, modest and sensitive to the North-South disequilibrium." Film journal Positif noted that the film's "attention to mise en scene makes the most quotidian situations touching.

Awards 
2012
 Won - Grand Prize, International Critic's Week, Cannes Film Festival
 Nominated - Best Breakthrough Director, Gotham Independent Film Awards
 Won - Best Film (Louve d'Or), Montréal Festival of New Cinema
 Won - Best Director, Thessaloniki International Film Festival
 Won - Best Film, Mumbai Film Festival
 Won - Best Director, Mumbai Film Festival
 Won - Best Film, Lone Star Film Festival 
 Won - Jury Special Mention, New Auteurs, AFI FEST
 Won - In Spirit for Freedom Award, Jerusalem Film Festival
 Opening Film, Best of Morelia International Film Festival
The film also participated in the Moscow Film Festival in 2012 (translator Andrey Efremov).

References

External links 
 

2012 films
American drama films
Spanish drama films
Mexican drama films
2010s Spanish-language films
Aquí y Allí Films films
2010s American films
2010s Spanish films
2010s Mexican films